Sir Thomas Spencer Wells, 1st Baronet (3 February 181831 January 1897) was surgeon to Queen Victoria, a medical professor and president of the Royal College of Surgeons of England.

Early life
He was born at St Albans, Hertfordshire and received his early education at St Albans School (then located in the Lady Chapel of the Abbey).

Career
After a short time as a pupil of a surgeon in Barnsley (Yorkshire), he studied medicine at Leeds, Trinity College Dublin, St Thomas' Hospital (becoming a Member of the Royal College of Surgeons (MRCS) in 1841 and a Fellow (FRCS) in 1844), and later in Paris, France.

He served as a naval surgeon in Malta, and then established his own ophthalmic surgery practice in London in 1853. In the same year he married Elizabeth Wright.  In 1854, and from 1856 to 78, he was surgeon of the Samaritan Free Hospital for Women, London (serving in between as an army surgeon in the Crimean War).  He also lectured at the Grosvenor School of Medicine (which later became the medical school of St George's Hospital).  In 1877 was appointed Hunterian Professor of Surgery and Pathology at the Royal College of Surgeons of England (of which he was elected president in 1883, in the same year he was created baronet). From 1863 to 1896 he was surgeon to Queen Victoria's household.

Wells specialized in obstetrics and ophthalmic surgery. He is recognized as a pioneer in abdominal surgery and is notable for having perfected ovariotomy. In 1879, his name was given to his invention of an improved pattern of artery forceps, which prevented entanglement of surrounding structures by the handles of the implement when in use. He was also one of the earliest surgeons to make use of anaesthetics in operations.  He published a number of important medical books and articles.

Thomas Spencer Wells was elected member of Leopoldina in 1886.

Later life
He died after an attack of apoplexy on 31 January 1897 and is buried in Brompton Cemetery. His Hampstead estate was sold to the London County Council and turned into a park.

References

C. Savona-Ventura: The naval career of Sir Thomas Spencer Wells in the Mediterranean: 1842–1853. Maltese Medical Journal, 1998, 10(2):41–46.

External links

 Biography in Plarr's Lives of the Fellows Online

1818 births
1897 deaths
People from St Albans
Baronets in the Baronetage of the United Kingdom
Burials at Brompton Cemetery
English surgeons
Fellows of the Royal College of Surgeons
Members of the German Academy of Sciences Leopoldina
People educated at St Albans School, Hertfordshire
Royal Navy Medical Service officers